Rodrigo Nicolás Formento Chialanza (born 25 September 1999) is a Uruguayan professional footballer who plays as a goalkeeper for Chilean club Coquimbo Unido, on loan from Cerro.

Club career
A youth academy graduate of Cerro, Formento made his professional debut on 13 April 2019 in a 2–0 league defeat against Progreso.

In April 2021, he joined Progreso on a season long loan deal.

International career
On 29 December 2019, Uruguay under-23 team head coach Gustavo Ferreyra named Formento in 23-man final squad for 2020 CONMEBOL Pre-Olympic Tournament.

Career statistics

Club

References

External links
 

1999 births
Living people
Footballers from Montevideo
Uruguayan footballers
Uruguayan expatriate footballers
Association football goalkeepers
Uruguayan Primera División players
Chilean Primera División players
C.A. Cerro players
C.A. Progreso players
Coquimbo Unido footballers
Expatriate footballers in Chile
Uruguayan expatriate sportspeople in Chile